Kazmaaul (Qazmaavul) is a rural locality (a selo) and the administrative centre of Kazmaaulsky Selsoviet, Khasavyurtovsky District, Republic of Dagestan, Russia. The population was 1,336 as of 2010. There are 31 streets.

Geography 
Kazmaaul is located 29 km northeast of Khasavyurt (the district's administrative centre) by road. Arkhida is the nearest rural locality.

References 

Rural localities in Khasavyurtovsky District